The 1949 International cricket season was from April 1949 to August 1949.

Season overview

June

New Zealand in England

July

Scotland in Ireland

August

England in Netherlands

References

1949 in cricket